Charles or Charlie Gilmour may refer to:

Charlie Gilmour (footballer, born 1942), Scottish footballer (Queen's Park)
Charlie Gilmour (footballer, born 1999), Scottish footballer (St Johnstone)
Lord Charles Gilmour, fictional character in Upstairs, Downstairs (1971 TV series)
Sir Charles Gilmour, 2nd Baronet (died 1750),  Scottish politician
Charlie Gilmour (writer), shortlisted for Wainwright Prize 2021 for Featherhood

See also
 Charles W. Gilmore (1874–1945), American paleontologist
 Charles Gilmore (speed skater) (born 1950), American speed skater